Julie-Ann Russell (born 28 March 1991) is a Republic of Ireland women's international footballer who currently plays for Galway in the Irish Women's National League.

In 2014, Russell was voted both FAI Senior Women's International Player of the Year and the Women's National League Senior Player of the Year. Russell has played in three FAI Women's Cup finals for three different teams – the Galway Ladies League, Salthill Devon and UCD Waves. Russell has also played ladies' Gaelic football at a senior level for both Galway and Connacht.

Early years
Russell grew up in Moycullen, County Galway where she attended Scoil Mhuire Maigh Cuilinn. Her older brother, John is also an association footballer and plays in the League of Ireland.

Club career

Salthill Devon
In 2007, together with Dora Gorman, Russell was a member of the Salthill Devon team that won the Under 16 Girls FAI Cup. In the final at Tolka Park, Russell scored the winner in a 3–2 extra–time win over Stella Maris. The following week, together with several Salthill Devon teammates including Niamh Fahey and Méabh De Búrca, Russell helped the Galway Ladies League win the 2007 FAI Women's Cup, defeating Raheny United 1–0 at Dalymount Park. Russell subsequently played for Galway in the 2008–09 UEFA Women's Cup. In 2010 Russell played in her second FAI Women's Cup final, this time with Salthill Devon who lost 4–2 to Peamount United. As well as playing for Salthill Devon, Russell and several of her teammates, including Dora Gorman, also played Gaelic football for Galway in the Ladies' National Football League. Russell also played for Connacht at interprovincial level.

University of Limerick
Between 2009 and 2013 Russell attended the Kemmy Business School at the University of Limerick where she gained a Business Studies and Marketing, 1st Class Honours degree. Together with Karen Duggan, Russell also played for the UL association football team that won the 2010 WSCAI Intervarsities Cup. They defeated a UCD team that featured Louise Quinn 2–1 in the final at Turners Cross. Duggan and Russell also helped the team win the WSCAI Premier Division in 2010–11. They also played for the UL ladies futsal team that won the 2011 WSCAI National Futsal Intervarsities title.
In 2011 Russell played for Los Angeles Strikers in the USL W-League, forming a strike partnership with Cherelle Khassal. In 2012 Russell completed a nine-month internship with Doncaster Rovers Belles in the FA WSL, fulfilling the work placement element of her UL degree. In addition to playing for Belles, she also worked for Doncaster Rovers F.C. in their marketing department as a digital ambassador. Russell was appointed as one of several FA WSL digital media ambassadors who wore their Twitter account name on their shirt sleeves to raise the profile of the league.

Peamount United
Russell, along with fellow UL student Karen Duggan, began playing for Peamount United in August 2011 and subsequently played for the club in their 2011–12 UEFA Women's Champions League campaign and during the inaugural 2011–12 Women's National League season. Russell also helped United win the WNL Cup in 2012–13. While playing for United, Russell was twice selected for the WNL Team of the Season in 2012–13 and 2013–14. In the latter season she was also named Senior Player of the Year.

UCD Waves
Between 2013 and 2014 Russell attended the Michael Smurfit Graduate Business School at University College Dublin where she achieved an Honours master's degree in marketing. Russell also played association football for UCD at intervarsity level, playing in teams alongside Dora Gorman, Siobhán Killeen and Ciara Grant. During the 2013–14 season Russell helped UCD win the WSCAI Futsal Cup and the WSCAI Premier Division. In 2014–15 when UCD Waves entered a team in the Women's National League, they also appointed the former Peamount United manager Eileen Gleeson to take charge of the team. Russell was one of several United players to follow Gleeson to Waves. Others included Aine O'Gorman, Karen Duggan, Dora Gorman, Chloe Mustaki and Emily Cahill. In 2015 Russell also started working as a Bing ads account manager for Microsoft.

Sydney University

Western Sydney Wanderers
In December 2020, Russell joined W-League club Western Sydney Wanderers.

International career
Russell has represented the Republic of Ireland at under-15, under-17, under-19, university and senior level. In December 2011, together with Dora Gorman, Megan Campbell, Ciara Grant, Louise Quinn, Grace Murray and Karen Duggan, Russell was included in an FAI scholarship programme for potential senior women's internationals.
Russell made her senior international debut on 29 October 2009, when she came on as a half–time substitute for Marie Curtin during a 2011 FIFA Women's World Cup qualifier against Kazakhstan. She created the Republic of Ireland's equalising goal in their 2–1 win.
She has subsequently represented the Republic of Ireland during their UEFA Women's Euro 2013, 2015 FIFA Women's World Cup and UEFA Women's Euro 2017 qualifying campaigns. Russell also represented the Republic of Ireland at the 2012 Algarve Cup and in Cyprus Cup tournaments. Russell also represented Ireland at the 2013 and 2015 Summer Universiades.

Honours

Association football
Individual
FAI International Football Awards Senior Women's International Player of the Year
 2014
FAI International Football Awards Under-19 Women's International Player of the Year
 2009
Women's National League Senior Player of the Year
 2013–14
Women's National League Team of the Season 
 2012–13, 2013–14
Peamount United
 Women's National League
Winners: 2011–12: 1
Runners-up: 2012–13, 2013–14: 2
 WNL Cup
 Winners: 2012, 2013: 2
FAI Women's Cup
Runners-up: 2012: 1
UCD Waves/UCD
Women's National League
Runners-up: 2014–15
FAI Women's Cup
Runners-up: 2014: 1
WNL Cup
Runners-up: 2016: 1
WSCAI Premier Division
Winners: 2013–14 
WSCAI Futsal Cup
Winners: 2014
Salthill Devon
FAI Women's Cup
Runners-up: 2010
Galway Ladies League
FAI Women's Cup
 Winners: 2007
University of Limerick
WSCAI Premier Division 
 Winners: 2010–11 
WSCAI Intervarsities Cup
 Winners: 2010
WSCAI National Futsal Intervarsities 
 Winners: 2011

References

1991 births
Living people
Alumni of University College Dublin
Alumni of the University of Limerick
Irish expatriate sportspeople in England
Association footballers from County Galway
Republic of Ireland women's association footballers
Republic of Ireland women's international footballers
Expatriate women's soccer players in the United States
Expatriate women's footballers in England
Women's association football forwards
USL W-League (1995–2015) players
Women's Super League players
Women's National League (Ireland) players
Salthill Devon F.C. players
Galway W.F.C. players
Peamount United F.C. players
DLR Waves players
Doncaster Rovers Belles L.F.C. players
Western Sydney Wanderers FC (A-League Women) players
Doncaster Rovers F.C. non-playing staff
Galway inter-county ladies' footballers
Connacht inter-provincial Gaelic footballers
Republic of Ireland women's futsal players
Ladies' Gaelic footballers who switched code
Expatriate women's soccer players in Australia
Irish expatriate sportspeople in Australia
Republic of Ireland expatriate association footballers
Republic of Ireland women's youth international footballers
Los Angeles Strikers players
Irish expatriate sportspeople in the United States